Where the Green Ants Dream is a 1984 English-language West German film co-written and directed by Werner Herzog, made in Australia. Based on a true story about Indigenous land rights in Australia but slated as a mixture of fact and fiction, the film only got a limited release in Australia and was not well received by critics, although it did fare a bit better in Europe and North America.

Plot
Based partly on the Milirrpum v Nabalco Pty Ltd ("Gove land rights") case about Indigenous land rights on the Gove Peninsula in Arnhem Land, Northern Territory, it was a mix of fact and fiction. The ant mythology was claimed as Herzog's own, but some First Nations peoples did consider the green ant as a totem animal that created the world and humans. Wandjuk Marika noted that the ant Dreaming belief existed in a clan that lived near Oenpelli in the Northern Territory.

The film is set in the Australian outback and is about a land feud between a mining company called Ayers (based on Nabalco) and the local Aboriginal people. The Aboriginal people claim that an area the mining company wishes to work on is the place where green ants dream, and that disturbing them will destroy humanity.

Production
Herzog made use of professional actors as well as Aboriginal activists from the Northern Territory who were involved in the case and local Aboriginal people from the main filming location, the desert town of Coober Pedy in South Australia. It was also filmed in and near Melbourne, Victoria.

Wandjuk Marika, recommended to Herzog by Phillip Adams, was a leader for the Rirratjingu clan of the Yolngu people, an artist and musician who was involved in activism for Aboriginal rights. His didgeridoo music is used in the movie, and several members of his family were cast in the film. The contract with Herzog allowed the Marikas to make enough money to move from Yirrkala to their ancestral region of Yalangbara (aka Port Bradshaw).

Cast

 Bruce Spence as Lance Hackett
 Wandjuk Marika as Miliritbi
 Roy Marika as Dayipu
 Ray Barrett as Cole
 Norman Kaye as Baldwin Ferguson
 Ralph Cotterill as Fletcher
 Nick Lathouris as Arnold
 Basil Clarke as Judge Blackburn
 Ray Marshall as Solicitor General Coulthard
 Dhungala I. Makika as the "mute"
 Gary Williams as Watson
 Tony Llewellyn-Jones as Fitzsimmons
 Robert Brissenden
 Michael Edols as young attorney
 Bob Ellis as supermarket manager
 Paul Cox as photographer
 James Ricketson as Philip Adams, mining leader
 Colleen Clifford as Miss Strehlow

Reception
Critics of the film found it uncomfortably placed between a documentary and a feature film. Public intellectual, broadcaster and social commentator Phillip Adams was particularly incensed and claimed that the film implied that the Australian Government was against Aboriginal peoples, leading him to write an article titled "Dammit Herzog, you are a Liar!"

It was generally poorly reviewed in Australia and did not get a wide release, and did not do as well in Germany as Herzog's previous films. Because of his name, it did get wide release in North America and Europe.

Film festivals and accolades

The film was entered in the 1984 Cannes Film Festival, but did not pick up any awards there. 
It appeared as an official selection at the Toronto International Film Festival, the Thessaloniki Film Festival, Montreal's Festival du nouveau cinéma and the Moscow International Film Festival, but was not selected at either the Sydney Film Festival or Melbourne International Film Festival.

It won a Silver award in the Outstanding feature film category and Gold for Best Cinematography at the German Film Awards in 1984, and was chosen as the film of the United Nations International Conference of Constitutional Rights in Quebec City in March 1985.

References

Further reading

External links
 
 
 

1984 films
1984 drama films
Australian drama films
German drama films
West German films
English-language German films
Films directed by Werner Herzog
Films set in Australia
Films about Aboriginal Australians
Films shot in South Australia
1980s English-language films
1980s German films